Naîgnouma Coulibaly (born May 31, 1989) is a Malian women's basketball player with Cavigal Nice Basket of the Ligue Féminine de Basketball and the Mali women's national basketball team. After winning the FIBA Africa Championship for Women 2007, Coulibaly represented Mali at the 2008 Summer Olympics.

After a long period in France, she joined in early September 2014 the Hungarian club DVTK Miskolc, which competes in the Eurocoupe. After spending the 2015–2016 season in Spain with Girona for 9.4 points and 8.6 rebounds in the championship and 8.5 points and 7.2 rebounds in the Euroleague, she commits to the Turkish club Canik. After three abroad, she returned to the LFB for 2017–2018 with Nice.

In January 2022, after leaving the Russian club Syktyvkar, she made her return to France with the Flammes Carolo.

References

1989 births
Living people
Malian women's basketball players
Basketball players at the 2008 Summer Olympics
Olympic basketball players of Mali
Malian expatriate basketball people in France
African Games gold medalists for Mali
African Games medalists in basketball
Malian expatriate basketball people in Spain
Malian expatriate basketball people in Hungary
Malian expatriate basketball people in Turkey
Malian expatriate basketball people in Poland
Malian expatriate basketball people in Russia
Centers (basketball)
Sportspeople from Bamako
Competitors at the 2015 African Games
21st-century Malian people